Nicolas Huet may refer to
 Nicolas Huet (snowboarder)
 Nicolas Huet the Younger (1770–1830), French natural history illustrator